John McNiven  (born 1935) is a Scottish weightlifter who competed at six Commonwealth Games, winning two bronze medals at the 1970 Commonwealth Games and the 1974 Commonwealth Games.

McNiven has won twenty five Scottish National championships.  He has also competed in 18 World Masters events, winning 14 of them.  McNiven was the first weightlifter to receive the World Masters Hall of Fame Award in 1993.

McNiven also worked as a fitter for Regional Railways; he was appointed Member of the Order of the British Empire (MBE) in the 1994 New Year Honours for services to the sport of Weightlifting.  He was inducted into the Scottish Sports Hall of Fame in 2003.

References

Living people
1935 births
British strength athletes
Scottish strength athletes
Scottish male weightlifters
Members of the Order of the British Empire
Weightlifters at the 1970 British Commonwealth Games
Weightlifters at the 1974 British Commonwealth Games
Commonwealth Games bronze medallists for Scotland
Commonwealth Games medallists in weightlifting
British Rail people
Medallists at the 1970 British Commonwealth Games
Medallists at the 1974 British Commonwealth Games